Neuquenraptor (meaning Neuquén thief) is a genus of dromaeosaurid theropod dinosaurs that lived in South America during the Late Cretaceous in what is now the Portezuelo Formation of Argentina. It is one of the first dromaeosaurids found in the Southern Hemisphere.

Discovery and naming

In January 1996 the remains of Neuquenraptor were found near Plaza Huincul in the Sierra del Portezuelo and reported that very year. In 1997 it was revealed the intended name was "Araucanoraptor argentinus". In 1999 it was provisionally described as a member of the Troodontidae. However, it was named as the type species Neuquenraptor argentinus in 2005 by Fernando Novas of the Bernardino Rivadavia Natural Sciences Museum and Diego Pol of Ohio State University and described as a dromaeosaurid. The generic name combines Neuquén, referring to the Neuquén Province and basin of northern Patagonia, Argentina, with Latin raptor meaning "thief". The specific name refers to Argentina.

Description
The known remains, holotype MCF-PVPH 77, were uncovered in layers of the Portezuelo Formation dating to the Coniacian. It consists of only a left foot, some cervical vertebrae fragments, ribs, tail chevrons and a radius.

It was larger than its close relative Buitreraptor, a genus it shared some osteological and physical similarities with.

Classification
Neuquenraptor might be a junior subjective synonym of Unenlagia; that is, the two might represent the same genus or even species, in which case the name Unenlagia would have to be used instead of Neuquenraptor because the former name was published earlier, in 1997, and thus has priority. Neuquenraptor was assigned by Novas and Pol to the Dromaeosauridae in a polytomy with several dromaeosaurid taxa. Later phylogenetic analyses have not treated it as a valid genus, combining its data with that of Unenlagia into a single unit.

Paleoecology

Neuquenraptor enjoys a special importance because of its provenance from South America. Until the discovery of Neuquenraptor, all dromaeosaurids had been found in North America, Europe or Northern China / Mongolia, and scientists believed that dromaeosaurids only inhabited Laurasia, i.e. the Northern Hemisphere. South America however, during the Mesozoic became part of Gondwana. The find of Neuquenraptor provides some possible indication of the degree of isolation between the Northern and Southern hemispheres.

The supercontinent Pangaea started to break up in the Early Jurassic, leading to the separation around 160 Ma of Laurasia in the north and Gondwana in the south. Gondwana itself was soon fragmented into West Gondwana (i.e., Africa and South America) and East Gondwana (i.e., Antarctica and Australia plus India and Madagascar).  West Gondwana broke apart during the Cretaceous, as Africa and South America separated between 132 and 90 Ma. Between approximately 80 and 60 Ma, i.e. in the Late Cretaceous and early Paleocene, North America and South America were perhaps connected, at least episodically, by a land bridge, due to the eastward motion of the Caribbean plate between the two continental masses.

See also
 Timeline of dromaeosaurid research

References

Unenlagiines
Coniacian life
Late Cretaceous dinosaurs of South America
Cretaceous Argentina
Fossils of Argentina
Portezuelo Formation
Fossil taxa described in 2005
Taxa named by Fernando Novas